John Powys may refer to:
 John Cowper Powys, English philosopher, lecturer, novelist, critic and poet
 John Powys, 5th Baron Lilford, British peer and cricketer